Elisabeth Mace (born 1933) is a British author of young adult speculative fiction.

Her first novels were a trilogy of post-apocalyptic novels beginning with Ransome Revisited (1975). Her last published novel was Under Siege (1988), in which video game characters come to life.

References

External links

British science fiction writers
British women writers
1933 births
Living people